Kavand-e Darvishan (also Romanized as Kāvand-e Darvīshān; also known as Kāvand) is a village in Mashayekh Rural District, Naghan District, Kiar County, Chaharmahal and Bakhtiari Province, Iran. At the 2006 census, its population registered at 396 people across 90 families. The village is populated by Lurs.

References 

Populated places in Kiar County
Luri settlements in Chaharmahal and Bakhtiari Province